Mateusz Żyro (born 28 October 1998) is a Polish professional footballer who plays as centre-back for Widzew Łódź.

Career

Legia Warsaw
On 7 July 2017, Żyro made his professional debut in Polish Super Cup against Arka Gdynia. Żyro was loaned out to Wigry Suwałki from February 2018 to the end of the season, and later Miedź Legnica for the 2018–19 season. He was loaned out again for the 2019–20 season, this time to Stal Mielec.

Stal Mielec
On 5 August 2020, he moved to Stal Mielec on a permanent basis and signed a two-year contract.

Widzew Łódź
On 9 June 2022, Żyro joined the newly promoted side Widzew Łódź on a two-year deal with a one-year extension option.

Personal life 
His older brother Michał (born in 1992) is also a professional football player who earned four caps for the Poland national team in 2014.

References

1998 births
Footballers from Warsaw
Living people
Polish footballers
Poland youth international footballers
Association football defenders
Legia Warsaw II players
Legia Warsaw players
Wigry Suwałki players
Miedź Legnica players
Stal Mielec players
Widzew Łódź players
Ekstraklasa players
I liga players
III liga players